Novohnativka is a village in Volnovakha Raion (district) in Donetsk Oblast of eastern Ukraine, at 53 km SSW from the centre of Donetsk city. Novohnativka is administratively subordinated to village council of Mykolaivka.

During the War in Donbass, in February 2016, an attempt was made by two groups of pro-Russian scouts to attack Ukrainian forces from the direction of Dokuchaievsk along the Novotroitske-Mykolaivka–Novohnativka stretch.

Demographics
According to census of 1897 the population of the settlement was 1089. According to Ukrainian Census of 2001 the population of the village was 722, native language of whom was as follows:
Ukrainian 19.53%
Russian 78.53%
Moldovan (Romanian) 0.83%
Armenian 0.55%

References

External links
 Weather forecast for Novohnativka

Villages in Volnovakha Raion